Man of Ashes (translit. Rih essed) is a 1986 Tunisian drama film directed by Nouri Bouzid. It was screened in the Un Certain Regard section at the 1986 Cannes Film Festival.

Cast

 Khadija Abaoub
 Sarra Abdelhadi
 Mustapha Adouani as Ameur
 Khaled Akrout
 Yacoub Bchiri as Levy
 Habib Belhadi
 Mahmoud Belhassen
 Noureddine Ben Ayed
 Souad Ben Sliman
 Fathia Chaabane
 Wassila Chaouki as Sejra
 Hamadi Dekhil
 Jamila Dhrif
 Mohamed Dhrif as Azaiez
 Habiba Gargouri
 Khaled Ksouri as Farfat
 Imed Maalal as Hachemi
 Sonia Mansour as Amina
 Lamine Nahdi
 Alham Nissar
 Mouna Noureddine as Nefissa
 Mongi Ouni
 Hedi Sanaa
 Chafia Trabelsi

References

External links

1986 films
1986 drama films
1986 LGBT-related films
1980s Arabic-language films
Films directed by Nouri Bouzid
Tunisian LGBT-related films
Tunisian drama films